Anton Ognyanov (born 30 June 1988) is a Bulgarian professional footballer who plays for Bulgarian Third League club Levski Krumovgrad. Known for his versatility, he is adept on the left wing, having played as a fullback as well as a winger.

Career

Lyubimets
In June 2011, Ognyanov joined Lyubimets. During a spell of nearly three years at the club, he scored 18 goals in total. In the promotion campaign of 2012–13 he scored 14 goals to fire Lyubimets into the A Group. In 2012, he was also appointed captain of the team due to his contributions and retained that position until his departure from the club in January 2014, totaling 68 matches for Lyubimets.

Levski Sofia
Ognyanov signed with Levski Sofia on 11 January 2014 on a two-and-a-half-year deal. He scored on his unofficial debut, a 5-3 friendly win against Chernomorets Burgas. However, Ognyanov sustained an unfortunate injury (rupture of his ligament of the ankle and a sprained left leg) in a friendly match against Viktoria Plzen which ruled him out until the end of the season, postponing his official Levski Sofia debut and preventing him from accepting a likely call-up to the national team for a friendly match against Belarus. On 27 July 2014, following his recovery from the injury, Ognyanov made his first official appearance for Levski Sofia after coming on a second-half substitute in the 0-2 loss against CSKA Sofia in The Eternal Derby.

Beroe
In January 2015, Ognyanov rejoined his hometown club Beroe.

Dunav Ruse
On 19 January 2016 he was released from Beroe, subsequently signing with the B Group team Dunav Ruse.

Cherno More
On 12 October 2017, Ognyanov signed with Cherno More following a successful trial period. On 21 October, he scored in his debut, after coming on as a late substitute for Stefan Stanchev in a 3–0 away win against Lokomotiv Plovdiv. On 12 December 2017, Ognyanov's contract was terminated by mutual consent.

Etar
Ognyanov joined Etar in January 2020.

Levski Krumovgrad
In June 2021, Ognyanov joined Third League club Levski Krumovgrad

References

External links
 
 
 Profile at LevskiSofia.info

1988 births
Living people
Bulgarian footballers
PFC Beroe Stara Zagora players
Neftochimic Burgas players
Botev Plovdiv players
FC Lyubimets players
PFC Levski Sofia players
FC Dunav Ruse players
PFC Cherno More Varna players
FC Vereya players
FC Botev Vratsa players
FC Botev Galabovo players
SFC Etar Veliko Tarnovo players
Association football wingers
First Professional Football League (Bulgaria) players
Sportspeople from Stara Zagora